The SS Sylvania was a  (Originally  long) Great Lakes freighter that had a long 79-year career on the Great Lakes. Sylvania was built by the West Bay City Shipbuilding Company of West Bay City, Michigan as hull #613. She was built for the Duluth Steamship Company of Duluth, Minnesota.

She had six accidents in her career, the first one occurred on June 12, 1905 when Sylvania collided with the steamer  of Whitefish Point, Lake Superior because of confused passing signals.

In 1914 the ship's name was changed to D.M. Philbin, she sailed with this name until August 30, 1929 when her name was changed back to Sylvania. On May 19, 1918 she collided with the steamer  two miles off Whitefish Point in a dense fog. On April 30, 1929 Sylvania grounded on the north side of Lake Erie after the crew mistook the Conneaut airport beacon for a navigation light, shortly after this the ship ran aground on a sandbar off Whitman's Creek to the west of Conneaut, Ohio.

New owners

In 1954 Sylvania was purchased by the Tomlinson Fleet Corporation of Cleveland, Ohio. In the winter of 1957-1958 the ship was lengthened 48 feet to 572 feet long, and converted to a self-unloader by Manitowoc Shipbuilding Company of Wisconsin. She was refloated by the McQueen Marine Building Company, and she arrived at Lorain, Ohio for repairs the next day. On 29 November 1968 she had a collision with the Diamond Alkali in the Fighting Island Channel of the Detroit River during a snow squall, she was repaired at American Shipbuilding Company of Lorain.

Final years of service

In 1971 Sylvania was sold to the Columbia Transportation Company of Cleveland, Ohio. On September 1, 1972 the ship stranded in the Detroit River. On November 8, 1972 Sylvania ran aground at Belle Isle in the Detroit River while traveling to the Connors Creek power plant. On August 23, 1973 Sylvania lost her rudder near Trenton, Michigan. On August 20, 1976 a fire broke out in the ship's cargo hold while she was moored at Lorain. On July 31, 1976 the ship ran aground near Trenton.

Scrapping

Sylvania made her last trip on May 10, 1980. She was laid up at Toledo, Ohio and towed to Ashtabula, Ohio by the Triad Salvage Company on November 1, 1983.

References

Great Lakes freighters
1905 ships
Ships built in Bay City, Michigan
Maritime incidents in 1905
Maritime incidents in 1916
Maritime incidents in 1918
Maritime incidents in 1922
Maritime incidents in 1929
Maritime incidents in 1967
Maritime incidents in 1968
Maritime incidents in 1972
Maritime incidents in 1973
Maritime incidents in 1976
Merchant ships of the United States
Steamships of the United States
Ships powered by a triple expansion steam engine